Globidens ("Globe teeth") is an extinct genus of mosasaur lizard classified as part of the Globidensini tribe in the Mosasaurinae subfamily.

Globidens alabamaensis was the first species of Globidens described, in a publication by Charles W. Gilmore (1912). It is used as the type specimen for Globidens.

Globidens belongs to the family Mosasauridae, which consists of several genera of predatory marine reptiles prevalent during the Late Cretaceous. Specimens of Globidens have been discovered in Syria, North America, Morocco, Angola, and Indonesia. Among mosasaurs, Globidens is probably most well known for its highly rounded, globe-like teeth.

Description

It was similar in appearance to other mosasaurs (streamlined body with flippers, a laterally flattened tail and powerful jaws). The teeth of Globidens differed from those of other mosasaurs in being globular, giving rise to its generic name. Most mosasaurs had sharp teeth evolved to grab soft, slippery prey like fish and squid, which in some later species were modified to rend flesh as well. While many other mosasaurs were capable of crushing the shells of ammonites, none were as specialized for dealing with armored prey as Globidens. Globidens had semispherical teeth with rounded points suited for crushing tough armored prey such as small turtles, ammonites, nautili, and bivalves. Like its larger relative, Mosasaurus, Globidens had a robustly built skull with tightly-articulating jaws that played a large role in the animal’s ability to penetrate the armor of its shelled prey.

Gilmore's initial assessment of Globidens, based on an incomplete specimen of G. alabamaensis, made note of characteristics observable in parts of the skull, the teeth, and one of the cervical vertebrae. He made note of a long snout with a large maxilla; a large, sturdy frontal bone; and the characteristic globular teeth with finely wrinkled enamel. Gilmore concluded that the skull characters were similar to Platecarpus or, more closely, to Brachysaurus (currently Prognathodon).
 
Studies since Gilmore's assessment establish more specific and more complete lists of diagnostic features. Gilmore correctly inferred that Globidens had a stout, powerfully built skull. In addition, a few notable skull characteristics include: a small parietal foramen, located entirely within the parietal; tuberosities present on the jugal; a longitudinal crest present on the dorsal surface of the frontal; and a premaxilla with a rostrum anterior to the premaxillary teeth. The rounded teeth with finely wrinkled enamel seen in Globidens are characteristic of Globidensini; however, the degree of rounding on individual teeth may be indicative of genus or even species. Marginal teeth in Globidens become most subspherical toward the center of the jaws. Additionally, Globidens had thirteen maxillary teeth, and either lacked or showed only rudimentary pterygoid dentition.

History of discovery
Globidens was first described in 1912 by Charles W. Gilmore. Using an incomplete specimen consisting only of a partial skull with several teeth, a single cervical vertebra, and numerous fragments, Gilmore identified Globidens as a new genus, naming his type specimen Globidens alabamaensis. The genus name was based on the globular structure of the specimen's teeth, and the species name on the location in which it was discovered. (It may be noted that the original location from which the specimen was taken is not precisely known, as Gilmore was examining a specimen that had been collected earlier.)

Since Gilmore's identification of Globidens, several other species have been identified, including G. dakotensis (Russel 1975), which currently is sometimes used as a secondary type specimen alongside G. alabamaensis. Some specimens previously thought to be new species of Globidens have since been reassigned to other taxa such as Prognathodon, or placed in a new taxa, such as G. aegypticus which is now a type specimen for Igdamanosaurus.

Species
 
Globidens alabamaensis Gilmore, 1912 - (Type specimen) Height of the tooth crown is less than the greatest tooth crown diameter behind the seventh maxillary tooth; crown length greater than crown width in front of the tenth maxillary tooth. The maxilla is long and the frontal narrow. Frontal bone slightly enters the orbits dorsally.
G. dakotaensis Russell, 1975 - Height of the tooth crown is less than the greatest tooth crown diameter behind the fourth maxillary tooth; crown length greater than crown width in front of the tenth maxillary tooth. The maxilla is long and the frontal broad. Frontal bone does not enter the orbits dorsally.
G. hisaensis Kaddumi, 2009 from central Jordan
G. phosphaticus Bardet et al. 2005 from Morocco and Angola.
G. simplex LeBlanc et al. 2019 from Morocco. A complete mandible and partial skull was recovered, showing large jaw adductor musculature attachment points indicative of hard shelled prey. A shortened dentary with respect to the Posterior Mandibular Unit relative to other globidensine mosasaurs supports this as well. Postcranial remains were also recovered, and histological analysis of one rib showed increased bone compactness reminiscent of conditions seen in early stages in marine tetrapod evolution, suggesting increased ability to stay submerged for long periods along the sea floor.

Further study or additional specimens may be necessary for the following:
G. schurmanni Martin, 2007

Reassigned species

Globidens aegyptiacus Zdansky, 1935; now type species of Igdamanosaurus.
Globidens fraasi Dollo 1913; now type species of Carinodens.
Globidens timorensis Huene, 1935; reinterpreted as a Triassic ichthyosaur

Classification
 
Globidens resides within the Subfamily Mosasaurinae, which includes several mosasaur lineages, and within that, the Tribe Globidensini, which also includes the genus Carinodens. Carinodens is thus regarded as a sister taxon of Globidens.

Placement of Globidens and, to an extent, Mosasauridae in a phylogenetic tree is somewhat unclear, and specific placement of genera varies between many morphological and molecular tests. It is generally agreed that Mosasauridae is a sister group to Pythonomorpha, which includes all snakes. Within Mosasauridae, Globidens is generally placed near Prognathodon, although some placements of Prognathodon specimens are questionable.

Cladogram of mosasaurs and related taxa modified from Aaron R. H. Leblanc, Michael W. Caldwell and Nathalie Bardet, 2012:

Paleobiology

Globidens was uniquely adapted to take advantage of hard-shelled food resources in comparison to other mosasaurs. In addition to a generally robust skull, its teeth are adapted for crushing rather than piercing or tearing. It is believed that Globidens was a durophagous predator, eating mollusks such as bivalves and ammonites. Stomach contents of a specimen found in South Dakota support prior assumptions, showing the crushed shells of inoceramid clams.

Paleoecology
Globidens, like other mosasaurs, lived in warm, shallow seas such as the Western Interior Seaway in North America. So far, Globidens has been discovered primarily in North America and in parts of northern and western Africa, such as Morocco and Angola, although specimens from the Middle East and eastern South America have been found as well. In Indonesia, Globidens lived in Timor island

See also

List of marine reptiles

References

 Everhart, M.J. 2008. Rare occurrence of a Globidens sp. (Reptilia; Mosasauridae) dentary in the Sharon Springs Member of the Pierre Shale (Middle Campanian) of Western Kansas. p. 23-29 in Farley G. H. and Choate, J.R. (eds.), Unlocking the Unknown; Papers Honoring Dr. Richard Zakrzewski, Fort Hays Studies, Special Issue No. 2, 153 p., Fort Hays State University, Hays, KS.
 Huene, E. von. 1935. Mosasaurier-Zähne von Timor. Centralblatt fur Mineralogie. Geologic und Palaeontologie; in Verbindung mit dens Neuen Jahrbuch fur Mineralogie, Geologie und Palaeontologie. Stuttgart. Abt. B 10 412-416, 3 figs. (in German)
 Martin, J. E. 2007. A new species of the durophagous mosasaur, Globidens (Squamata: Mosasauridae) from the Late Cretaceous Pierre Shale Group of central South Dakota, USA. Pages 167-176 in Martin, J. E. and Parris D. C. (eds.), The Geology and Paleontology of the Late Cretaceous Marine Deposits of the Dakotas. Geological Society of America, Special Paper 427. (Globidens schurmanni)
 Russell, Dale A. 1975. A new species of Globidens from South Dakota. Fieldiana Geology, 33(13): 235-256. (Field Museum of Natural History)

Mosasaurines
Mosasaurs of North America
Fossil taxa described in 1912
Mosasaurs of Asia
Mosasaurs of Africa
Taxa named by Charles W. Gilmore
Mooreville Chalk